The 1948–49 NCAA men's basketball rankings was made up of a single human poll – the AP Poll – with weekly editions released between January 18, 1949, and March 8, 1949.

Legend

AP Poll 
This was the initial season for the AP college basketball poll. It was modeled after its college football poll, which began in the mid-1930s.

References 

1948-49 NCAA Division I men's basketball rankings
College men's basketball rankings in the United States